Willie O Winsbury is Child Ballad 100 (Roud 64). The song, which has numerous variants, is a traditional Scottish ballad that dates from at least 1775, and is known under several other names, including "Johnnie Barbour" and "Lord Thomas of Winesberry".

Synopsis

A king is away for a long time. His daughter becomes pregnant by the hero, William or Thomas.  The king threatens to hang him, but is struck by his beauty and offers him the heroine, gold, and land. The hero accepts the lady but declares the gold and the land to be his lady's, not his own.

Historical Basis

This ballad closely parallels Child ballad 99, "Johnie Scot".

In one variant, the lands are specifically described: he will be king when he returns to Scotland.  
It may, in fact, be based on James V's courtship of and marriage to Madeleine de Valois of France; James came to see the woman he was betrothed to in disguise, and went on to meet the princess, who fell in love with him.

Thomas and his  brother or possibly son William, both of Winsbury in Shropshire, were given protection for being in Scotland in November 1336 [see 'Calendar of Documents relating to Scotland'; Vol.5, no.3538, p.505(Supplementary; Public Records Office, Ed. Grant Simpson & James Galbraith; available online]. Winsbury is a small township of 1 square mile just to the west of Chirbury. It was the base of the Winsbury family in the 13th and 14th centuries.[See R W Eyton 'Antiquities of Shropshire'; Vol. XI. pp. 167-172. Available online.] Thomas was a mid-level official in the service of Shropshire and the English central authorities. [For an example see Calendar of Fine Rolls 1331 p.290 & 1333, p.374]. There seem to be only one place named Winsbury. Thomas and William of Winsbury were in Scotland when these popular ballads were being composed. If there is a connection the exiled king would have been David II who was in France from 1333 to 1341, however he had no children at all.

Nowadays the song is often sung to the tune of "Fause Foodrage", rather than its own traditional tune.

Recordings

Andy Irvine sang "Willy O'Winsbury" on Sweeney's Men's eponymous debut album in 1968, accompanying himself on guitar. The recording featured the tune of "Fause Foodrage" (Child 89), which is now commonly used for "Willie O' Winsbury". On the album's sleeve notes, band member Johnny Moynihan wrote, "A ballad for which Andy is renowned. He got the text from Child's 'English and Scottish Ballads'; looking up the tune he got his numbers confused and emerged with the wrong air. By chance it suited the song very well". In 2010, Irvine re-recorded the song with a fuller arrangement of the same tune for his album Abocurragh, adding: "This is Child 100. I collected the words from different versions and as the story goes, on looking up the tune, I lighted on the tune to number 101. I'm not sure if this is true but it's a good story".

The song "Farewell, Farewell", recorded by Fairport Convention on their album Liege and Lief in 1969, is an adaptation featuring new lyrics by Richard Thompson.  A recording of "Willie O' Winsbury" played and sung by Thompson was included in the 2006 boxset RT - The Life and Music of Richard Thompson.

Following is a list of notable recordings of the ballad including, for each entry, the year of release, artist, song title, and album title:

See also
 List of the Child Ballads
 Johnie Scot

References

Scottish folk songs
Child Ballads
Traditional ballads
1770s songs
18th-century ballads